The Journal of Accounting and Economics is a peer-reviewed academic journal focusing on the fields of accounting and economics. The editors-in-chief are J. Core (Massachusetts Institute of Technology), E. deHann (University of Washington), and W. R. Guay (University of Pennsylvania).

According to the Journal Citation Reports, the journal has a 2021 impact factor of 7.239.

See also 
 Accounting research

References

External links
 

Elsevier academic journals
Accounting journals
Bimonthly journals
Publications established in 1979
English-language journals